Darren Rahul Pragasam (born 27 August 1999 in Seremban) is a Malaysian professional squash player. As of August 2018, he was ranked number 133 in the world.

References

1999 births
Living people
Malaysian male squash players
Malaysian people of Indian descent
Southeast Asian Games medalists in squash
Southeast Asian Games gold medalists for Malaysia
Southeast Asian Games bronze medalists for Malaysia
Competitors at the 2019 Southeast Asian Games
21st-century Malaysian people